Jack William Lynch (born 22 June 1995) is an English footballer who plays as a midfielder for Northern Premier League Division One North club Colne, on loan from National League North side Chorley.

Career
Lynch began his career with Carlisle United and made his professional debut on 10 August 2013 in a 4–0 defeat at Bradford City. He left Carlisle in 2014 and subsequently joined National League North side Chorley. He made his Chorley debut on 12 August in a league match against Colwyn Bay. In 2015, Lynch signed with Clitheroe of Northern Premier League Division One North on a dual registration deal. He returned to Chorley in 2016 before going out on loan to fellow NPL Division One North club Colne, he went to Colne on an initial one-month loan on 23 October but the deal was extended to the end of the season on 22 December.

Career statistics

Club
.

References

External links

1995 births
Living people
English footballers
Footballers from Blackburn
Association football midfielders
Carlisle United F.C. players
Chorley F.C. players
Clitheroe F.C. players
Colne F.C. players
English Football League players
National League (English football) players
Northern Premier League players